There are a number of peaks named Baldy:

Canada
Baldy Mountain (Manitoba), 
Big Baldy Mountain (Vancouver Island, British Columbia),

United States

Peaks named "Baldy"

Peaks named "Baldy Mountain"

Peaks named "Baldy Peak"

Peaks named "Big Baldy" or "Little Baldy"

Peaks named "Mount Baldy"

Peaks named "Old Baldy"

Peaks with other variants of "Baldy"